The men's 25 metre center-fire pistol team competition at the 2014 Asian Games in Incheon, South Korea was held on 26 September at the Ongnyeon International Shooting Range.

Schedule
All times are Korea Standard Time (UTC+09:00)

Records

Results

References

ISSF Results Overview

External links
Official website

Men Pistol 25 C T